Helen Miller Gould Shepard (June 20, 1868 – December 21, 1938) was an American philanthropist born in Manhattan in New York City.

Birth
Born as Helen Miller Gould, she was the first-born daughter of Jay Gould and Helen Day Miller (1838–1889). Her sister Anna Gould was another prominent heiress.

Marriage
She attended New York University School of Law, and she married Finley Johnson Shepard (1867–1942) on January 22, 1913.

They adopted three children and had one foster child, Louis Seton. The adopted children were:
 Finley Jay (named for Finley Johnson Shepard and Jay Gould), a three-year-old abandoned child who was found on the steps of Manhattan's St Patrick's Cathedral in 1914,
 Olivia Margaret (named for Helen's dear friend Mrs. Russell Sage),
 Helen Anna (named for Helen and her sister, Anna).

Helen had also cared for her brother Frank Gould's twin daughters, Helen Margaret and Dorothy (b. 1904) by his first wife, Helen Kelly.

American Bible Society
In 1918 she and Emma Baker Kennedy became the first female vice presidents of the American Bible Society.

Philanthropy
At the commencement of the Spanish–American War, she donated US$100,000 to the United States government in support of the war. She gave an additional US$50,000 toward military hospital supplies and was active in the Women's National War Relief Association, working in a hospital for wounded soldiers. She donated the library building at New York University and began the Hall of Fame. She gave US$10,000 for the engineering school. She gave additional contributions to Rutgers College. Both the YMCA and the YWCA benefited from her contributions, as well as other organizations. She was a member of the board of the Russell Sage Foundation and of the national board of the YWCA.

Golf Course
She purchased Shepard Hills in Roxbury, New York, including Kirkside Lake. The facility originally produced ice for the Roxbury in the winter months and the lake was used for recreation for the community in the summer months. Construction of the 9-hole golf course began around 1916 and upon completion served her estate.

Death
She died on December 21, 1938 and was buried in the family mausoleum on December 23, 1938.

References

External links

Guide to the Helen Miller Gould Shepard Papers, 1814-1941

1868 births
1938 deaths
Philanthropists from New York (state)
People from Manhattan
New York University School of Law alumni
Gould family
People from Roxbury, New York
Burials in the Jay Gould Mausoleum
Critics of atheism
American anti-communists